A sea-king (sækonungr) in the Norse sagas is generally a title given to a powerful Viking chieftain, even though the term sea-king may sometimes predate the Viking age.

The Orkneyinga saga contains the earliest reference to sea-kings. There the original line of 'kings' of Kvenland (present-day Finland) ends with the father of Gor Thorrasson 'Sea King'. The appellation of 'Sea King' to subsequent names, from Gor to his great-grandson, Sveidi, suggests that they lose or surrender their inheritance as Kven kings and rule the seas instead, eventually ending up as minor lords in Norway.

Sea-kings could also be independent or noble Norwegian and Danish chieftains, and also kings of Sweden (such as Yngvi and Jorund), or sons of kings, such as Refil. However, they could also be men "without roof" like Hjörvard the Ylfing; such men without roof could be so powerful that they could subdue a country and make themselves kings. Two examples are Sölve who killed the Swedish king Östen, and Haki who killed the Swedish king Hugleik. However, in both cases they ultimately lost due to lack of popular support.

List of sea-kings as given in the Nafnaþulur 1-5 

 Ale the Strong
 Asmund
 Atal
 Ati
 Atli
 Audmund
 Beimi
 Beimuni
 Beiti
 Budli
 Byrvil
 Ekkil
 Endill
 Frodi
 Eynef
 Gaupi
 Gæir
 Gauti|Geat
 Gautrek
 Geitir
 Gestil
 Gjuki
 Glammi
 Gor
 Gudmund
 Gylfi
 Hagbard
 Haki
 Half
 Harek
 Heiti
 Hemlir
 Hiorolf
 Hjalmar
 Hnefi
 Hogni
 Homar
 Horvi
 Hraudnir
 Hraudung
 Hun
 Hunding
 Hviting
 Hæmir
 Iorek
 Kilmund
 Leifi
 Longhorn
 Lyngvi
 Mævi
 Mævil
 Meiti
 Moir
 Mysing
 Nori
 Næfil
 Ræfil
 Randver
 Rakni
 Reifnir
 Rer
 Rodi
 Rokkvi
 Skefil
 Skekkil
 Solsi
 Solvi
 Sorvi
 Sveidi
 Teiti
 Thvinnil
 Vandil
 Vinnil
 Virfil
 Yngvi

References 

 Names of Sea-Kings ("Heiti Sækonunga") by Björn Sigfússon in Modern Philology, Vol. 32, No. 2 (Nov., 1934), pp. 125-142

Viking rulers
Piracy in the Atlantic Ocean
Medieval piracy